Sin Jin-ho (Hanja: 申塡灝; born 7 September 1988) is a South Korean footballer who plays for Pohang Steelers as midfielder.

Career statistics

Club

Honours 

Pohang Steelers
K League 1: 2013
Korean FA Cup: 2012, 2013

Ulsan Hyundai
AFC Champions League: 2020

External links 
 

1988 births
Living people
Association football goalkeepers
South Korean footballers
South Korean expatriate footballers
Pohang Steelers players
Qatar SC players
Al-Sailiya SC players
Emirates Club players
FC Seoul players
Gimcheon Sangmu FC players
Ulsan Hyundai FC players
K League 1 players
Qatar Stars League players
Expatriate footballers in Qatar
Expatriate footballers in the United Arab Emirates
South Korean expatriate sportspeople in Qatar
South Korean expatriate sportspeople in the United Arab Emirates
UAE Pro League players
Association football midfielders